Reina Mercedes refers to several topics:

"Reina Mercedes" is Spanish for "Queen Mercedes," and refers to Mercedes of Orleans, Queen Consort of Spain, wife of Alfonso XII.
Reina Mercedes was a Spanish cruiser that fought in the Spanish–American War.
USS Reina Mercedes was a ship in the United States Navy.
Reina Mercedes is a municipality in the Philippines.